Koh-Lanta: Vanuatu was the sixth season of Koh-Lanta, the French version of Survivor. This season took place in Vanuatu, and was broadcast on TF1 from July 21 to September 5, 2006, on Fridays at 6:55 p.m. The two original tribes this season were Mosso and Tana. Along with the typical aspects of the game, this season contestants had to deal with both a cyclone and a series of earthquakes (one of which damaged the immunity idol). Due to several medical evacuations, Alain, Nathalie, and Sébastien who were all initially eliminated early on returned to the game.

The winner was François-David Cardonnel who took home the prize of €100,000.

Contestants

Future appearances
Émilie Frahi and François-David Cardonnel returned for Koh-Lanta: Le Retour des Héros. Ludovic Laresche returned for Koh-Lanta: Le Combat des Héros.

Voting history

External links
Official site archive 

06
2006 French television seasons
Television shows filmed in Vanuatu